Korina Perkovic (born 14 April 1987) is a German former tennis player.

In her career, she won three singles and seven doubles titles on the ITF Circuit. On 2 April 2007, she reached her best singles ranking of world No. 339. On 28 April 2008, she peaked at No. 299 in the doubles rankings.

ITF Circuit finals

Singles: 7 (3 titles, 4 runner-ups)

Doubles: 11 (7 titles, 4 runner-ups)

External links
 
 

1987 births
Living people
Tennis players from Frankfurt
German female tennis players
German people of Yugoslav descent